Michael S. Martin is a United States Marine Corps major general who served as the Assistant Deputy Commandant for Combat Development and Integration in 2022. He most recently served as the Deputy Commander of the Marine Forces Reserve. Previously, he served as the Commanding General of the 4th Marine Division from September 8, 2018 to October 2, 2020.

References

External links

Year of birth missing (living people)
Living people
People from Holyoke, Massachusetts
United States Marine Corps generals
Military personnel from Massachusetts